Ezequiel Adamovsky (born 1971) is an Argentine historian and political activist who has written many articles and books about intellectual history, globalization, anti-capitalism and left-wing politics. He is a professor at both the University of San Martín and the University of Buenos Aires. He is also an accomplished researcher, working for the National Council for Scientific and Technological Research and the CNRS. He has been nominated for and received many awards for his writing, including the Iberoamerican Book Award, which he received in 2020.

References

1971 births
20th-century Argentine writers
20th-century Argentine male writers
21st-century Argentine writers
21st-century Argentine male writers
Argentine activists
21st-century Argentine historians
Argentine political writers
Living people
Male non-fiction writers